Repeat loop may refer to:

 For loop – Commonly known as the repeat (x) { ... } loop.
 Do while loop – Known as the repeat { ... } until (!CONDITION) loop.
 Infinite loop – Known as the repeat forever { ... } loop.

Control flow